Gadebridge is a district of Hemel Hempstead in Hertfordshire, UK, located north west of Hemel Hempstead old town. It was developed from land that once formed part of Gadebridge House in the 1960s and centres on the Rossgate shopping parade. Gadebridge Park is the largest green space in Hemel Hempstead. A major Roman villa was discovered here at the time of its development (Gadebridge Park Roman Villa). The population of the Dacorum ward (including Piccotts End) at the 2011 Census was 5,655.

See also
Gadebridge Park

References

Gadebridge Park Attractions Dacorum Borough Council

Areas of Hemel Hempstead